Professional Building, also known as the American Bank and Trust Company building, is a historic commercial building located at Suffolk, Virginia. It was built between 1916 and 1919, and is a seven-story, steel frame building with Pyrobar fireproofing.  The building measures 35.2 feet wide by 81 feet deep.  It is 80 feet tall and has Colonial Revival style architectural details.

It was added to the National Register of Historic Places in 1999.  It is located in the Suffolk Historic District.

References

Commercial buildings on the National Register of Historic Places in Virginia
Colonial Revival architecture in Virginia
Commercial buildings completed in 1919
Buildings and structures in Suffolk, Virginia
National Register of Historic Places in Suffolk, Virginia
Individually listed contributing properties to historic districts on the National Register in Virginia